Mehbooba Mahnoor Chandni, known as Chandni is a Bangladeshi model, actress and dancer. She had roles in the films Dukhai, Lalsalu and Joyjatra.

Biography
Chandni started taking lessons of dancing at the age of four. She learned Bharatanatyam, modern and Bangladeshi dance under Hero. She became first in group dancing in Notun Kuri competition telecasted on BTV.

Chandni started her career through the film Dukhai in 1994. She also appeared in television plays. She has earned a good name as a dancer and widely travels abroad. She performed in the cultural program as Bangladeshi community in Brunei Darussalam celebrated their 42nd Independence and National day in 2012.

Chandni married musician Bappa Mazumder on March 21, 2008 and got divorced in 2017.

Works

Films

Dramas

Awards

References

External links
 
 Mehbooba Mahnoor Chandni at the Bangla Movie Database

Living people
Bangladeshi female dancers
Bangladeshi female models
Bangladeshi film actresses
Bangladeshi choreographers
Best Supporting Actress National Film Award (Bangladesh) winners
Year of birth missing (living people)